Teleocichla is a genus of fish in the family Cichlidae found in the Tapajós, Xingu, Tocantins and Jari River basins, which are part of the Amazon River Basin in Brazil. All species are rheophilic, and highly elongated in shape. Since restricted to areas with fast currents (such as cataracts and rapids), they are particularly vulnerable to the building of dams, and the Belo Monte Dam may cause the extinction of T. centisquama. Other species recognized as threatened by Brazil's Ministry of the Environment are T. cinderella, T. prionogenys and T. wajapi.

Species
There are currently 9 recognized species in this genus, but several undescribed species are known.

 Teleocichla centisquama Zuanon & I. Sázima (fr), 2002 
 Teleocichla centrarchus Kullander, 1988
 Teleocichla cinderella Kullander, 1988
 Teleocichla gephyrogramma Kullander, 1988
 Teleocichla monogramma Kullander, 1988
 Teleocichla preta H. R. Varella, Zuanon, Kullander & López-Fernández, 2016
 Teleocichla prionogenys Kullander, 1988
 Teleocichla proselytus Kullander, 1988
 Teleocichla wajapi H. R. Varella & C. L. R. Moreira, 2013

References

Cichlid genera
Geophagini
Freshwater fish genera
Taxa named by Sven O. Kullander